The following highways are numbered 694:

United States